Armstrong Creek is a suburb of Geelong, Victoria, Australia. It was gazetted in February 2012 as part of the Armstrong Creek Growth Area, and was mostly farm land which had been part of Connewarre and Mount Duneed. At the 2021 census, Armstrong Creek had a population of 11,247.

In August 2019, the City of Greater Geelong announced that, subject to final planning approval, construction of the sustainable Sparrovale Wetlands system, on the Barwon River floodplain, was to begin in October 2019, after council had awarded a $3.25 million contract to Goldsmith Civil and Environmental.

References

Suburbs of Geelong